Amicactenus is a genus of wandering spiders first described by A. Henrard & Rudy Jocqué in 2017.

Species
 it contains four species:
Amicactenus eminens (Arts, 1912) — Togo, Ivory Coast
Amicactenus fallax (Steyn & Van der Donckt, 2003) — Ivory Coast
Amicactenus mysticus Henrard & Jocqué, 2017 — Guinea, Liberia
Amicactenus pergulanus (Arts, 1912) — West, Central Africa

References

External links

Araneomorphae genera
Ctenidae